is a Japanese weightlifter. He competed in the men's featherweight event at the 1976 Summer Olympics.

References

1953 births
Living people
Japanese male weightlifters
Olympic weightlifters of Japan
Weightlifters at the 1976 Summer Olympics
Place of birth missing (living people)
Medalists at the 1978 Asian Games
Asian Games bronze medalists for Japan
Weightlifters at the 1978 Asian Games
Asian Games medalists in weightlifting
World Weightlifting Championships medalists
20th-century Japanese people
21st-century Japanese people